Patricia Knight (born Marjorie Heinzen; April 28, 1915 – October 26, 2004) was an American actress who appeared in a few movies in the late 1940s and early 1950s.

Career
In 1949, Knight and her husband, Cornel Wilde, acted at Cape Playhouse in a production of Western Wind.

Personal life
After meeting actor Cornel Wilde at a producer's office in 1936, the couple eloped to Elkton, Maryland, where they married on September 1, 1937.  They had one daughter, Wendy, and divorced on August 30, 1951. The family lived at Country House on Deep Canyon Road, Los Angeles. She married Danish businessman Niels Larson on October 24, 1954, and moved with him to Europe.

She and Larson returned to the United States in 1969. Larson died in 1971. She later married building adviser David Wright, and moved with him to Hemet, California, where he died on May 22, 1996. Patricia Knight died in Hemet in 2004, aged 89.

A Democrat, Wright supported the campaign of Adlai Stevenson during the 1952 presidential election.

Filmography
 The Fabulous Texan (1947) as Josie Allen
 Roses are Red (1947) as Jill Carney
 Shockproof (1949) as Jenny Marsh
 The Second Face (1950) as Lynn Hamilton
 The Magic Face (1951) as Vera Janus
 The Lone Wolf (1954) as Janice Avon

References

External links

Patricia Knight's biography at Glamour Girls of the Silver Screen

1915 births
2004 deaths
American film actresses
Actresses from Boston
20th-century American actresses
California Democrats
Massachusetts Democrats
People from Hemet, California
21st-century American women